Fairisle is a community in the Canadian province of New Brunswick. It is situated in Alnwick, a parish of Northumberland County.

The local service district of Fair Isle takes its name from this community but spells it differently.

History

Notable people

See also
List of communities in New Brunswick

References

Communities in Northumberland County, New Brunswick
Local service districts of Northumberland County, New Brunswick